Austrochaperina yelaensis is a species of frog in the family Microhylidae endemic to Papua New Guinea. It was originally only known from a specimen found around 1960 but was rediscovered again at the original location and a new one at Vanatinai. The population is unknown as it is not uncommon but also not frequently found. There are no major threats and it is protected by Vanatinai and Rossel Island.
Its natural habitat is subtropical or tropical moist lowland forests.

References

Sources

Austrochaperina
Amphibians of Papua New Guinea
Taxonomy articles created by Polbot
Amphibians described in 2000